The 1953 Davidson Wildcats football team was an American football team that represented Davidson College during the 1953 college football season as a member of the Southern Conference. In their second year under head coach Bill Dole, the team compiled an overall record of 0–9, with a mark of 0–5 in conference play, and finished in last place in the SoCon.

Schedule

References

Davidson
Davidson Wildcats football seasons
College football winless seasons
Davidson Wildcats football